Georges Akl is a Lebanese painter, born in Damour.

Career
He is noted for his colorful watercolor landscapes. He is often exhibited in Lebanon  and had made exhibitions in Washington, Los Angeles and Cairo. He is also a theater director and an actor.

References

Georges Akl work: http://www.georgesakl.com/

External links
 Nostalgia and Hope: Greater Washington Chapter Exhibition  (in French)

Year of birth missing (living people)
Living people
People from Chouf District
Lebanese painters